Myung-ok, also spelled Myong-ok, is a Korean feminine given name. Its meaning differs based on the hanja used to write each syllable of the name. There are 19 hanja with the reading "myung" and five hanja with the reading "ok" on the South Korean government's official list of hanja which may be registered for use in given names.

People with this name include:
Marie Myung-Ok Lee (born 1964), American writer of Korean descent
Kim Myung-ok (born 1972), South Korean field hockey player
Yim Myung-ok (born 1986), South Korean volleyball player
An Myong-ok, North Korean politician
Sin Myong-ok, North Korean gymnast; see list of Asian Games medalists in gymnastics

See also
List of Korean given names

References

Korean feminine given names